West Germany (performing under the banner Germany) was present at the Eurovision Song Contest 1986, held in Bergen, Norway.

Before Eurovision

Ein Lied für Bergen
The German national final to select their entry, Ein Lied für Bergen, was held on 27 March at the Deutsches Theater in Munich, and was hosted by Sabrina Lallinger and Wenche Myhre. Myhre represented Germany in the 1968 Contest.

Twelve songs made it to the national final, which was broadcast by Bayerischer Rundfunk to ARD broadcasters across West Germany. The winner was decided by a sampling of 500 random West Germans who were meant to symbolize a fair representation of the country's population. Each person gave every song a vote, from 1 (for worst) to 12 (for best). Therefore, the theoretical "worst score" a song could receive would be 500, and the "best score" would be 6000.

The winning entry was "Über die Brücke geh'n", performed by Ingrid Peters and composed by Hans Blum.

At Eurovision
Peters was the fourteenth performer on the night of the Contest, following Belgium and preceding Cyprus. At the close of the voting the song had received 62 points, placing 8th in a field of 20 competing countries. The German jury awarded its 12 points to Luxembourg.

Voting

References

External links
German National Final 1986

1986
Countries in the Eurovision Song Contest 1986
Eurovision